The Morongo Unified School District (MUSD) is a public education governing body in the Mojave high desert of Southern California. MUSD has more than 1,100 employees who provide educational services to 9,301 students.

Summary
Currently, MUSD has eleven elementary schools, two middle schools, two comprehensive high schools, two continuation high schools, two state preschool programs, and a special education preschool program. Administrative offices are located in Twentynine Palms, California.

San Bernardino County School Superintendent provides leadership for this district.

Schools

Elementary
 Condor Elementary School (in Twentynine Palms US Marine Corps Base).
 Friendly Hills Elementary School (Grades K-7) - opened in 1990s.
 Joshua Tree Elementary School (current campus opened in 2013).
 Landers Elementary School - opened in 2000s.
 Morongo Valley Elementary School - opened in 1980s.
 Oasis Elementary School, Twentynine Palms - opened in 1980s.
 Onaga Elementary School, Yucca Valley - opened in 2000s.
 Palm Vista Elementary School, Twentynine Palms - opened in 1980s.
 Twentynine Palms Elementary School (expected to close).
 Yucca Mesa Elementary School (Grades K-8) - opened in 2000s.
 Yucca Valley [Hope] Elementary School (oldest in district, was Central Public School).

Middle
 La Contenta Middle School, Yucca Valley - opened in 1991
 Twentynine Palms Junior High School - original Elem/Jr High/Sr High school in town

High
 Twentynine Palms High School - opened 1975
 Yucca Valley High School - opened 1968
 Black Rock High School (continuation)

References

External links
 

School districts in San Bernardino County, California
Twentynine Palms, California
Yucca Valley, California